Castel Guelfo di Bologna (Eastern Bolognese:  or ) is a comune (municipality) in the Metropolitan City of Bologna in the Italian region Emilia-Romagna, located about  southeast of Bologna.

Castel Guelfo di Bologna borders the following municipalities: Castel San Pietro Terme, Dozza, Imola, Medicina.

References

External links
 Official website

Cities and towns in Emilia-Romagna